Brandon Svendsen (born April 11, 1985) is an American professional ice hockey player who is currently playing for the Rockford Icehogs in the American Hockey League.

On November 7, 2010, he was signed as a free agent by the Bridgeport Sound Tigers.

References

External links

Living people
Bridgeport Sound Tigers players
1985 births
Ice hockey players from Michigan
Rockford IceHogs (AHL) players
American men's ice hockey forwards